Candide Preis (originally called Stadtschreiber Stipendium, later Candide Preis) is the only German-French Literary award, named for its French satire Candide (first published in 1759 by Voltaire).From 1995 to 2011 it was awarded annually by the Foundation Genshagen, the Literary Association Minden, the Villa Gillet (Lyon) and the Minister of Culture (France) to French and German contemporary authors.

List of laureates 
 1995: Franz Hodjak
 1996: Gert Loschütz
 1997: Katja Lange-Müller
 1998: Hansjörg Schertenleib
 1999: Christine Scherrmann
 2000: Andreas Mand
 2001: Harald Gröhler
 2002: Burkhard Spinnen
 2003: Roland Koch (author)
 2004: Andreas Maier
 2005: Daniel Kehlmann
 2006: Karl-Heinz Ott
 2007: André Kubiczek
 2008: Martin Kluger and Mathias Énard
 2009: Volker Braun and Olivia Rosenthal
 2010: Jan Faktor
 2011: Peter Handke

External links 
Foundation Genshagen (German)
 Official website of the Villa Gillet (French)
 Official website of the Literary Association Minden (German)

References 

Awards established in 1995
German literary awards
French literary awards
France–Germany relations
Novella awards